USNS Indomitable (T-AGOS-7) was a United States Navy  in service from 1985 to 2002. From 2003 until 18 June 2014, she was in commission in the National Oceanic and Atmospheric Administration (NOAA) as the oceanographic research ship NOAAS McArthur II (R 330). As of 2018 it serves as a mother ship now named the Deep Submersible Support Vessel (DSSV) Pressure Drop for the crewed deep-ocean research submersible DSV Limiting Factor.

Construction
Indomitable was laid down by the Tacoma Boatbuilding Company at Tacoma, Washington on  26 January 1985 and launched on  16 July 1985. She was delivered to the U.S. Navy on 26 November 1985 and placed in non-commissioned service in the U.S. Navys Military Sealift Command on  1 December 1985 as USNS Indomitable (T-AGOS-7), a United States Naval Ship with a mixed crew of U.S. Navy personnel and civilian merchant mariners.

U.S. Navy service
Stalwart-class ships were designed to collect underwater acoustical data in support of Cold War anti-submarine warfare operations. Accordingly, Indomitable employed Surveillance Towed Array Sensor System (SURTASS) equipment on Cold War underwater surveillance duties during the final years of the Cold War.

After the Cold War ended with the collapse of the Soviet Union in late December 1991, requirements for such surveillance declined.  In 1993, Indomitables SURTASS gear was removed, and she received an AN/SPS-49 radar for use in counternarcotics surveillance. In her new role for counter narcotics patrol she deployed for two missions per year starting September 1993. As well as her civilian crew, she embarked 18 Navy personnel to operate her sensors and coordinate with authorities. For her first five missions she averaged 300 days underway per year operating in the Caribbean Sea and Panama Canal area.

Due to her extended at sea times, she operated a Civilian Ham Radio station from 1994–1995 for the crew to maintain contact with their families. Stateside operators freely cooperated making long-distance calls for the crew. The Navy retired Indomitable from service on 2 December 2002 and struck her from the Naval Vessel Register the same day.

National Oceanic and Atmospheric Administration service

On 9 December 2002, Indomitable was transferred to the National Oceanic and Atmospheric Administration (NOAA). NOAA converted her into an oceanographic research ship. She was commissioned in the NOAA fleet as NOAAS McArthur II (R 330) on  20 May 2003, replacing the NOAA survey ship , which was decommissioned the same day in a combined ceremony.

Capabilities
McArthur II has berthing for 38 people in 18 single staterooms, eight double staterooms, and one quadruple stateroom, providing her with the capacity to carry up to 15 scientists on domestic voyages or up to 14 scientists and a United States Public Health Service officer on international voyages. She can seat 16 people at a time in her crews mess.

McArthur II has a wet laboratory freezer, a dry laboratory freezer, and an oceanographic laboratory refrigerator. On deck, she has a 2.3-ton-capacity deck crane with a boom that extends to 46 feet (14 m), two oceanographic winches, a movable A-frame, and a movable J-frame. She carries one  and one  Zodiac rigid-hulled inflatable boats (RHIB).

Operations
McArthur II was an active member of the NOAA Pacific Fleet with her home port at Seattle, Washington. She departed Seattle on her maiden NOAA cruise on  1 June 2003. She conducted oceanographic research and assessments throughout the eastern Pacific Ocean, including along the United States West Coast - where she was involved in studies in several national marine sanctuaries - and the Pacific coast of Central America and South America. She engaged in measurements of chemical, meteorological, and biological sampling for several large-scale programs within NOAA, and the scientists who carry out research aboard her come from many divisions of NOAA, as well as other United States Government agencies, U.S. state government agencies, and academia.

McArthur II was retired by NOAA on  18 June 2014. She had been inactive since 2011.

Caladan Oceanic LLC service

In 2017 the vessel was bought by Caladan Oceanic LLC and prepared to serve as a mother ship for the crewed deep-ocean research submersible . The vessel was named DSSV Pressure Drop because the financial sponsor Victor Vescovo admires the ship names found in the Culture novels written by Iain M. Banks.

Beginning in December 2018, the Pressure Drop began execution of the Five Deeps Expedition to support a crewed submersible visit to the bottom of all five of the world's oceans. On 19 December 2018, the first of the five oceans bottoms was visited: the bottom of the Atlantic at the Puerto Rico trench. In August 2019, the Pressure Drop completed the Five Deeps Expedition after the Limiting Factor submersible successfully made the first crewed descent to the bottom of the Arctic Ocean, the Molloy Deep.

The animal was later identified by University of Western Australia researcher Alan Jamieson and Smithsonian Institution zoologist Mike Vecchione as a magnapinnid, also known as a bigfin squid. This was the deepest sighting ever of a squid.

In February 2022, Pressure Drop and its submersible were offered for sale for $50 million. Vescovo announced that he sold the whole Hadal Exploration System including the DSSV Pressure Drop to Gabe Newell’s Inkfish Open Ocean Program.

Awards and decorations

References

Notes

Bibliography
 Wertheim, Eric, ed. The Naval Institute Guide to Combat Fleets of the World, 15th Edition: Their Ships, Aircraft, and Systems. Annapolis, Maryland: United States Naval Institute Press, 2007. . .

External links

 
 NavSource Online: Service Ship Photo Archive
 NOAA Marine Operations McArthur II

 

Stalwart-class ocean surveillance ships
Ships built by Tacoma Boatbuilding Company
1985 ships
Cold War auxiliary ships of the United States
Ships of the National Oceanic and Atmospheric Administration
NOAA ex-U.S. Navy Stalwart-class oceanographic research ships